This is a timeline documenting the events of heavy metal in the year 2003.

Newly formed bands
 A Day to Remember
The Abominable Iron Sloth
Abysmal Dawn
Adler's Appetite
Aina
Airbourne
Anagnorisis
Anubis Gate 
As Blood Runs Black
As They Sleep
At All Cost
August Burns Red
Baroness 
Battlecross
Blessed by a Broken Heart
Bloody Panda
 Born of Osiris
Carach Angren
The Chariot 
Communic
Conducting from the Grave
Dååth
 Damageplan
Darkwater
Demonoid
Diablo Swing Orchestra
Eisbrecher
Emmure
Furia 
Head Control System
Hypno5e
In Vain 
Jesu 
 Job for a Cowboy
Jon Oliva's Pain
 Kayo Dot
Kroda
Leaves' Eyes
Les Discrets
Lyriel
Myrkgrav
Nadja 
Ne Obliviscaris 
Neaera
Om  
Parkway Drive  
Powerwolf  
Rosetta 
The Ruins of Beverast 
Skeletonwitch 
The Sword 
Sybreed 
Tesseract  
Threat Signal  
 Through the Eyes of the Dead
Thulcandra
Trollfest
Turmion Kätilöt
 Wintersun
Wolfchant
Wolves in the Throne Room

Reformed bands
 24-7 Spyz
 Child's Play
 Fear Factory
 Judas Priest
 Killing Joke
 MC5
 Primus
 Stryper
 Twisted Sister

Albums

 8 Foot Sativa - Season for Assault
 Aborted – Goremageddon: The Saw and the Carnage Done
 Akercocke – Choronozon
 Alien Ant Farm – truANT
 Alice Cooper – The Eyes of Alice Cooper
 All Shall Perish – Hate, Malice, Revenge
 Anaal Nathrakh – When Fire Rains Down from the Sky, Mankind Will Reap as It Has Sown (EP)
 Anthrax – We've Come for You All
 Apocalyptica – Reflections
 Arch Enemy – Anthems of Rebellion
 As I Lay Dying – Frail Words Collapse
 Avenged Sevenfold – Waking the Fallen
 Bathory - Nordland II
 Between the Buried and Me – The Silent Circus
 Belphegor - Lucifer Incestus
 Biohazard – Kill or Be Killed
 The Black Dahlia Murder – Unhallowed
 Black Label Society – The Blessed Hellride
 Bon Jovi – This Left Feels Right (Compilation)
 Brujeria - The Mexecutioner! - The Best of Brujeria (Compilation)
 Cannibal Corpse – 15 Year Killing Spree (Box set)
 Children of Bodom – Hate Crew Deathroll
 Chimaira – The Impossibility of Reason
 Circle II Circle – Watching in Silence
 Coal Chamber - Giving the Devil His Due (Compilation)
 Concept – Reason and Truth
 Cog – "Open Up" (maxi single)
 Cradle of Filth – Damnation and a Day
 The Darkness – Permission to Land
 Deathstars – Synthetic Generation
 Decrepit Birth – ...And Time Begins
 Deep Purple – Bananas
 Default – Elocation
 Deftones – Deftones
 Deicide - The Best of Deicide (Compilation)
 Destruction - Metal Discharge
 DevilDriver – DevilDriver
 The Devin Townsend Band – Accelerated Evolution
 Dimension Zero – This Is Hell
 Dimmu Borgir – Death Cult Armageddon
 Divinity Destroyed – Divinity Destroyed (EP)
 Divinity Destroyed – Eden in Ashes
 DragonForce – Valley of the Damned
 Dream Evil – Evilized
 Dream Theater – Train of Thought
 Enslaved – Below the Lights
 Entombed – Inferno
 Epica – The Phantom Agony
 Evanescence – Fallen
 Evergrey – Recreation Day
 Every Time I Die - Hot Damn!
 Faith – Salvation Lies Within
 Fear Factory - Hatefiles (Compilation)
 Finntroll – Visor om slutet (EP)
 Fireball Ministry – The Second Great Awakening
 Firewind – Burning Earth
 From Autumn to Ashes – The Fiction We Live
 Galneryus – The Flag of Punishment
 Godhead – Evolver
 Godsmack – Faceless
 Gojira – The Link
 Gojira – Maciste All'Inferno (EP)
 Gorgoroth - Twilight of the Idols
 Graveworm – Engraved in Black
 Hatebreed – The Rise of Brutality
 Helloween – Rabbit Don't Come Easy
 Hortus Animae – Waltzing Mephisto
 Ill Nino - Confession
 Incubus – Live at Lollapalooza 2003 (Live)
 Integrity – To Die For
 Iron Maiden – Dance of Death
 Ion Dissonance – Breathing Is Irrelevant
 Jane's Addiction – Strays
 Johnny Lokke – Wrecking Ball
 Kamelot – Epica
 Katatonia – Viva Emptiness
 Kayo Dot – Choirs of the Eye
 King Diamond – The Puppet Master
 Kiss – Kiss Symphony: Alive IV (Live)
 Korn – Take a Look in the Mirror
 Kreator – Live Kreation (Live)
 Krisiun – Works of Carnage
 Lamb of God – As the Palaces Burn
 Lanfear – The Art Effect
 Limp Bizkit – Results May Vary
 Linkin Park – Meteora
 Living Colour – Collideøscope
 Lost Horizon – A Flame to the Ground Beneath
 Macabre – Murder Metal
 Marduk - World Funeral
 Masterplan – Masterplan
 Marilyn Manson – The Golden Age of Grotesque
 Machine Head – Through the Ashes of Empires
 Metallica – St. Anger
 Ministry – Animositisomina
 Misanthrope - Sadistic Sex Daemon
 Mnemic – Mechanical Spin Phenomena
 Monstrosity – Rise to Power
 Moonspell – The Antidote
 Morbid Angel – Heretic
 Motörhead – Live at Brixton Academy (Live)
 Mushroomhead - XIII
 Neil Turbin – Threatcon Delta
 Nevermore – Enemies of Reality
 Nightrage – Sweet Vengeance
 Ningen Isu – Shura bayashi
 Norther – Mirror of Madness
 Nothingface – Skeletons
 No-Big-Silence – Unreleased
 Occult – Elegy for the Weak
 Old Man's Child – In Defiance of Existence
 One Minute Silence – One Lie Fits All
 Overkill – Killbox 13
 Opeth – Damnation
 Pantera - The Best of Pantera: Far Beyond the Great Southern Cowboys' Vulgar Hits! (Compilation)
 Pitchshifter – Bootlegged, Distorted, Remixed and Uploaded (Compilation)
 Place of Skulls – With Vision
 P.O.D. – Payable on Death
 Poison the Well - You Come Before You
 Psycroptic – The Scepter of the Ancients
 Queensrÿche – Tribe
 Rage – Soundchaser
 Royal Hunt – Eyewitness
 Rush – Rush in Rio (live)
 Seven Witches – Passage to the Other Side
 Six Feet Under – Bringer of Blood
 Skid Row – Thickskin
 Skillet – Collide
 Sepultura – Roorback
 Sevendust – Seasons
 Slayer – Soundtrack to the Apocalypse (Box set) 
 Soilwork – Figure Number Five
 Solefald – In Harmonia Universali
 Sonata Arctica – Winterheart's Guild
 Spawn of Possession – Cabinet
 Static-X – Shadow Zone
 Strapping Young Lad – Strapping Young Lad
 Stratovarius – Elements, Pt. 1
 Stratovarius – Elements, Pt. 2
 Stryper – 7: The Best of Stryper (compilation)
 Theocracy – Theocracy
 Throwdown – Haymaker
 Three Days Grace - Three Days Grace 
 Tourniquet – Where Moth and Rust Destroy
 Trivium – Ember to Inferno
 Type O Negative – Life Is Killing Me
 Týr – Eric the Red
 uneXpect – _wE, Invaders (EP)
 Virgin Black – Elegant... and Dying
 Yattering -Genocide
 Xandria – Kill the Sun

Disbandments 
 Coal Chamber
 Five Pointe O
 Limbonic Art
 Immortal
 Pitchshifter
 Pantera
 Reveille
 Rollins Band (reformed in 2006)

Events 
 Metallica hires new bassist Robert Trujillo (from Suicidal Tendencies and Ozzy Osbourne). They release the much criticized album St. Anger.
 MTV2 resurrected the old heavy metal/hard rock television program Headbangers' Ball.
 Iced Earth vocalist Matt Barlow leaves Iced Earth after the events of September 11.
 Christian metal band Stryper reforms with all original members.
 Visions of Atlantis lead vocalist Christian Stani quits, and is later replaced by Mario Plank. Keyboardist Chris Kamper quits and is replaced by Miro Holly.
 Rob Halford reunites with Judas Priest replacing Tim "Ripper" Owens.
 Aerosmith and KISS embark on a tour together.
 Toontown Field Trip: Rock and Roll Party, starring the voice talent of Russi Taylor as Minnie Mouse, Nikita Hopkins as Roo, and Kelly Nigh as Tickety Tock, is released on home video and features Poler Toyer & School Bus performing "Give It Your Best Shot" in New Orleans towards the end of the movie.

References 

2000s in heavy metal music
Metal